Nayanthara is an Indian actress and film producer known for her work in Tamil, Telugu and Malayalam film industries. She made her acting debut with Sathyan Anthikad's Malayalam film Manassinakkare in 2003, the financial success of which helped her receive more acting offers. She followed this with two more Malayalam films the following year: Shaji Kailas' Natturajavu, and Fazil's psychological thriller Vismayathumbathu. Nayanthara's first appearance in a non-Malayalam film was Hari's Tamil film Ayya, released in 2005. While still shooting for this film, she was cast in another Tamil film Chandramukhi, after its director P. Vasu's wife had seen Manassinakkare and recommended her. The film ran for over 100 days in theatres, eventually turning Nayanthara into one of the most-sought after actresses in Tamil. Later that year, she played a supporting role in AR Murugadoss' Ghajini, which also became a major commercial success.

Nayanthara made her Telugu cinema debut with Lakshmi in 2006, and followed this with another Telugu film, Boss the same year. She appeared in four Tamil films that year: Kalvanin Kadhali, Vallavan, Thalaimagan and E. Nayanthara received praise for her performance in Billa (2007). The success of that film led to Sify describing her as "the glamour queen of Tamil cinema". Her 2008 release Yaaradi Nee Mohini was her only successful film as a lead actress that year. She had three releases in 2009: Villu, Anjaneyulu and Aadhavan. In 2010, all her releases, which featured her as the female lead, turned out to be commercial successes: she had five box office hits in the four Southern languages – Adhurs (Telugu) Bodyguard (Malayalam), Simha (Telugu), Boss Engira Bhaskaran (Tamil) and the Kannada film Super, which marked her first and only appearance in Kannada cinema. Her performances in Simha, Boss Engira Bhaskaran and Super eventually fetched her nominations for the Filmfare Best Actress Award in the respective languages.

In 2011, Nayanthara portrayed Sita in Sri Rama Rajyam, based on an episode in the Hindu epic Ramayana, for which she won the Filmfare Award for Best Actress – Telugu. Her performance in Krishnam Vande Jagadgurum (2012) earned her another nomination in the same category. She won the Filmfare Award for Best Actress – Tamil for Raja Rani (2013) Naanum Rowdy Dhaan (2015), and Aramm (2017), and was nominated for the same for Iru Mugan (2016).

Films

Music videos

Producer 
 Netrikann (2021)
 Rocky (2021) as a Presenter
 Kaathu Vaakula Rendu Kaadhal (2022)
 Connect (2022)
Koozhangal / Pebbles (TBA)
 Oorkuruvi (TBA)
 Walking Talking Strawberry IceCream (TBA)
 Shubh Yatra (Gujarati Film) (TBA)

See also 
 List of awards and nominations received by Nayanthara

Notes

References 

Actress filmographies
Indian filmographies